Exhibition Center station may refer to:

 Exhibition Center station (Dongguan Rail Transit), a station on the Dongguan Rail Transit in Dongguan, Guangdong.
 Exhibition Centre station (MTR), a station on the East Rail line of MTR in Hong Kong.
 Exhibition Centre railway station, a ScotRail station in Glasgow, Scotland.
 Taipei Nangang Exhibition Center Station, a station on Bannan and Wenhu Line in Taipei, Taiwan
 Kaohsiung Exhibition Center light rail station, a station on Circular Light Rail in Kaohsiung, Taiwan
 Nongye Zhanlanguan (Agricultural Exhibition Center) station, a station on the Beijing Subway in Beijing.
 Guozhan (China International Exhibition Center) station, a station on the Beijing Subway in Beijing.

See also
 Exhibition station (disambiguation)
 Convention and Exhibition Center station (disambiguation)